Emil Lind (1872–1948) was an Austrian actor.

Selected filmography
 The Story of Dida Ibsen (1918)
 Die Arche (1919)
 Prostitution (1919)
 Humanity Unleashed (1920)
 The Infernal Power (1922)
 I.N.R.I. (1923)
 Superfluous People (1926)
 Mata Hari (1927)
 The Weavers (1927)
 Bigamie (1927)

Bibliography
 Jung, Uli & Schatzberg, Walter. Beyond Caligari: The Films of Robert Wiene. Berghahn Books, 1999.

External links

1872 births
1948 deaths
Austrian male film actors
Austrian male stage actors
Austrian male silent film actors
Male actors from Vienna
20th-century Austrian male actors